Almike Moussa N'Diaye (born 26 October 1996) is a professional footballer who plays as a midfielder for Championnat National 3 club Vaulx-en-Velin. Born in Spain, he plays for the Mauritania national team.

Career
As a youth player, N'Diaye joined the youth academy of Spanish club Banyoles. After that, he signed for the reserve team of French club GOAL FC. In 2018, N'Diaye signed for Championnat National 3 club Vaulx-en-Velin.

References

External links
 
 

Living people
1996 births
People from Pla de l'Estany
Sportspeople from the Province of Girona
Spanish people of Mauritanian descent
Spanish sportspeople of African descent
Citizens of Mauritania through descent
Spanish footballers
Mauritanian footballers
Association football midfielders
Mauritania international footballers
2021 Africa Cup of Nations players
Spanish expatriate footballers
Spanish expatriate sportspeople in France
Expatriate footballers in France
Mauritanian expatriate sportspeople in France
Mauritanian expatriate footballers